This is a list of people who disappeared mysteriously: 1910–1990 or whose deaths or exact circumstances thereof are not substantiated. Many people who disappear end up declared presumed dead and some of these people were possibly subjected to forced disappearance.

This list is a general catch-all; for specialty lists, see Lists of people who disappeared.

1910s

1920s

1930s

1940s

1950s

1960s

1970s

1980s

See also

 List of fugitives from justice who disappeared
 List of kidnappings
 List of murder convictions without a body
 List of people who disappeared mysteriously: pre-1910
 List of people who disappeared mysteriously: 1990–present
 Lists of solved missing person cases
 List of unsolved deaths

References

20th-century missing person cases
Disappeared
Disappeared
People